Roberto Santucci (born 1967) is a Brazilian filmmaker. Santucci holds degrees for the Columbia College Hollywood and University of California. He started his career as a filmmaker directing short films, and then action films. However, due to low box offices, and even a film that was never released, Alucinados, Santucci decided to "do a film that they [the producers] want to do". This was De Pernas pro Ar, a commercial success, followed by other comedy commercial success, including Até que a Sorte nos Separe and De Pernas pro Ar 2.

Filmography
 Helpless (1994; short film)
 Bienvenido Brazil (1995; short film)
 Olé – Um Movie Cabra da Peste (2000)
 Bellini and the Sphinx (2001)
 Alucinados (2008)
 De Pernas pro Ar (2010)
 Sequestro Relâmpago (2010)
 Até que a Sorte nos Separe (2012)
 De Pernas pro Ar 2 (2012)
 Odeio o Dia dos Namorados (2013)
 Até que a Sorte nos Separe 2 (2013)
 De Pernas pro Ar 3 (2015)

References

External links

1967 births
Brazilian film directors
Brazilian film producers
Brazilian screenwriters
Living people
University of California alumni

Brazilian people of Italian descent